The 1958 Glover Trophy was a motor race, run to Formula One rules, held on 7 April 1958 at Goodwood Circuit, England. The race was run over 42 laps of the circuit, and was won by British driver Mike Hawthorn in a Ferrari Dino 246.

Results

A second Ferrari was entered by Scuderia Ferrari and shown in entry lists as #2, but no driver was assigned and the car did not run.

References
 "The Grand Prix Who's Who", Steve Small, 1995.
 Results at www.silhouet.com 

Glover Trophy
Glover Trophy
20th century in West Sussex
Glover
Glover Trophy